During the 2000–01 English football season, Southampton Football Club competed in the FA Premier League.

Season summary
Southampton enjoyed their best form in several years after it was announced that Glenn Hoddle was replacing Dave Jones as manager on a permanent basis.

But Hoddle caused outrage by walking out on the Saints in late March and taking the managerial vacancy at Tottenham Hotspur the next day. Coach Stuart Gray took over on a temporary basis, and with Southampton's good form continuing he was rewarded with the job on a permanent basis. Southampton's best moment was an 89th-minute winner by Matt Le Tissier to pull back from 2–1 down against runners-up Arsenal.

This was Southampton's final season at the Dell. After 103 years, they moved to the St Mary's Stadium on Brittania Road, which, with 32,000 seats, was more than twice the size of their old ground and seen by many as the way forward for the club.

Final league table

Results summary

Results by round

Results
Southampton's score comes first

Legend

FA Premier League

FA Cup

League Cup

Squad

Left club during season

Reserve squad

Transfers

In

Out

Transfers in:  £1,275,000
Transfers out:  £10,000
Total spending:  £1,265,000

Statistics

Starting 11
Considering starts in all competitions

References

Southampton F.C. seasons
Southampton